The 1960 Gator Bowl may refer to:

 1960 Gator Bowl (January), January 2, 1960, game between the Arkansas Razorbacks and the Georgia Tech Yellow Jackets
 1960 Gator Bowl (December), December 31, 1960, game between the Florida Gators and the Baylor Bears